The 2017 AON Open Challenger was a professional tennis tournament played on clay courts. It was the fifteenth edition of the tournament which was part of the 2017 ATP Challenger Tour. It took place in Genoa, Italy between 5 and 10 September 2017.

Singles main-draw entrants

Seeds

 1 Rankings are as of 28 August 2017.

Other entrants
The following players received wildcards into the singles main draw:
  Matteo Donati
  Julian Ocleppo
  Andreas Seppi
  Stefanos Tsitsipas

The following players received entry into the singles main draw as alternates:
  Riccardo Bonadio
  Federico Gaio
  Hubert Hurkacz

The following players received entry from the qualifying draw:
  Andrea Basso
  Gianluca Di Nicola
  Andrea Pellegrino
  Tim Pütz

Champions

Singles

  Stefanos Tsitsipas def.  Guillermo García López 7–5, 7–6(7–2).

Doubles

  Tim Pütz /  Jan-Lennard Struff def.  Guido Andreozzi /  Ariel Behar 7–6(7–5), 7–6(10–8).

References

AON Open Challenger
2017
2017 in Italian tennis